Canned tomatoes, or tinned tomatoes, are tomatoes, usually peeled, that are sealed into a can after having been processed by heat.

Variants
Canned tomatoes are available in several different forms. The traditional forms are whole peeled tomatoes, packed in juice or purée, and ground tomatoes, sometimes referred to as "kitchen-ready." Ground tomatoes are not to be confused with purée, which is similar but more cooked. Taste tests indicate that whole tomatoes packed in juice tend to be perceived as fresher-tasting than those packed in purée. Crushed tomatoes, commonly used for pasta sauces, are made by adding ground tomatoes to a heavy medium made from tomato paste. Diced tomatoes have become increasingly common for applications where a chunkier or more substantial product is needed.  In recent years, the Petite Diced form (3/8" cut pieces) has become the fastest growing segment of canned tomatoes.

Usage
In areas and situations where in-season, perfectly ripe tomatoes are not available, canned tomatoes are often used as an alternative to prepare dishes such as tomato sauce or pizza.  The top uses for canned tomatoes are Italian or pasta sauces, chili, soup, pizza, stew, casseroles, and Mexican cuisine.

Economic aspects
Industrially produced canned tomatoes are an important product and subject to regular market analysis as well as trade considerations.

Home preservation
Home canned tomatoes may be prepared in a number of ways. However, safety measures need to be taken since improperly canned tomatoes can cause botulism poisoning, whether produced industrially or at home.

Diced tomatoes

Diced tomatoes usually refers to tomatoes that have been diced. In the United States retail environment, however, the term refers to canned chunks of plum tomatoes in tomato juice or tomato purée, sometimes seasoned with basil or garlic. This product is a relatively recent arrival in the processed tomato market, and has become quite popular since its introduction in the mid-90s, probably due to American tastes for a chunkier tomato sauce. Calcium chloride is sometimes added to stabilize the cell structure of the canned tomatoes, giving the end product a firmer texture.

Canned diced tomatoes are primarily used in Italian-American cuisine. They are generally available in two sizes, regular (roughly 2 cm or 7/8 in) for long-cooked dishes and petite (roughly 1 cm) for quicker applications.

See also

 Ketchup
 List of tomato dishes
 Passata

References

Tomato products
Canned food